Inquisitor michaelmonti is a species of sea snail, a marine gastropod mollusc in the family Pseudomelatomidae.

Distribution
This marine species occurs off the Philippines.

References

 Stahlschmidt P., Poppe G.T. & Tagaro S.P. (2018). Descriptions of remarkable new turrid species from the Philippines. Visaya. 5(1): 5-64.page(s): 23, pl. 17 figs 1-3.

michaelmonti
Gastropods described in 2018